Jordan Kerr and Robert Lindstedt were the defending champions, but lost in the semifinals to Mikhail Youzhny and Mischa Zverev.

Mikhail Youzhny and Mischa Zverev won in the final 6–3, 6–4, against Lukáš Dlouhý and Leander Paes.

Seeds

Draw

Draw

External links 
 Draw

AIG Japan Open Tennis Championships